Johann Georg Goldammer (* 23 August 1949) is director of the Global Fire Monitoring Center (GFMC). The GFMC is a contribution of Germany to the United Nations Office for Disaster Risk Reduction (UNDRR) and voluntary commitment to the Sendai Framework for Disaster Risk Reduction, hosted by the Max Planck Institute for Chemistry (Mainz, Germany) and Freiburg University (Freiburg, Germany).

Academic activities
A professor  at Albert Ludwigs University of Freiburg, Department of Forest and Environmental Sciences. The University hosts the Global Fire Monitoring Center (GFMC), a body which is instrumental in facilitating communication between national and regional forest fire organizations and NGOs. He co-convenes the IGBP-IGAC-BIBEX programme and serves as leader of the UN-FAO/ECE/ILO Team of Specialists on Forest Fire and coordinator of the Wildland Fire Advisory Group and the Global Wildland Fire Network of the UN International Strategy for Disaster Reduction (ISDR). He is also member of the ISDR Interagency Task Force for Disaster Reduction.  Goldammer has ongoing research concerns on all continents since the mid-1970s and was involved in designing, preparing and partially implementing international and interdisciplinary research campaigns and fire experiments. A series of international conferences organized by the group have produced several monographs on regional and global fire ecology.

Bibliography
Reviewed Journal and Book Submissions:

Wildfires and Forest Development in Tropical and Subtropical Asia: Prospective outlook towards the year 2000 In: Proc. Symp. Wildland Fire 2000, April 27–30, 1987, South Lake Tahoe, Cal., 164-176. USDA For.Ser. Gen. Techn. Rep. PSW-101, 258 p.
International Issues: Report of Futuring Group 9. In: Proc. Symp. Wildland Fire 2000, April 27–30, 1987, South Lake Tahoe, Cal., 256-258. USDA For. Ser. Gen. Techn. Rep. PSW-101, 258 p.
Rural land-use and fires in the tropics. Agroforestry Systems 6, 235-252.
Natural rain forest fires in Eastern Borneo during the Pleistocene and Holocene. Naturwissenschaften 76, 518-520.
Fire in the tropical biota. Ecosystem processes and global challenges. Ecological Studies 84, Springer-Verlag, Berlin-Heidelberg-New York, 497 p.
Fire in tropical ecosystem and global environmental change. In: Fire in the tropical biota. Ecosystem processes and global challenges (J.G.Goldammer, ed.), 1-10. Ecological Studies 84, Springer-Verlag, Berlin-Heidelberg-New York, 497 p.
The impact of droughts and forest fires on tropical lowland rain forest of Eastern Borneo. In: Fire in the tropical biota. Ecosystem processes and global challenges (J.G.Goldammer, ed.), 11-31. Ecological Studies 84, Springer-Verlag, Berlin-Heidelberg-New York, 497 p.
The role of fire in the tropical lowland deciduous forests of Asia. In: Fire in the tropical biota. Ecosystem processes and global challenges (J.G.Goldammer, ed.), 32-44. Ecological Studies 84, Springer-Verlag, Berlin-Heidelberg-New York, 497 p.
Fire in the pine-grassland biomes of tropical and subtropcal Asia. In: Fire in the tropical biota. Ecosystem processes and global challenges (J.G.Goldammer, ed.), 45-62. Ecological Studies 84, Springer-Verlag, Berlin-Heidelberg-New York, 497 p.
Prescribed burning in industrial pine plantations. In: Fire in the tropical biota. Ecosystem processes and global challenges (J.G.Goldammer, ed.), 216-272. Ecological Studies 84, Springer-Verlag, Berlin-Heidelberg-New York, 497 p.
Global change: effects on forest ecosystems and wildfire severity. In: Fire in the tropical biota. Ecosystem processes and global challenges (J.G.Goldammer, ed.), 463-486. Ecological Studies 84, Springer-Verlag, Berlin-Heidelberg-New York, 497 p.
Fire in ecosystem dynamics. Mediterranean and northern perspectives. SPB Academic Publishing, The Hague, 199 p.
The role of fire in the montane-boreal coniferous forest of Daxinganling, Northeast China: A preliminary model. In: Fire in ecosystem dynamics. Mediterranean and northern perspectives (J.G. Goldammer and M.J.Jenkins, eds.), 175-184. SPB Academic Publishing, The Hague, 199 p.
Waldumwandlung und Waldverbrennung in den Tiefland-Regenwäldern des Amazonasbeckens: Ursachen und ökologische Implikationen. In: Amazonien: Versuch einer interdisziplinären Annäherung (A. Hoppe, ed.), 119-142. Ber. Naturforsch. Ges. Freiburg 80, 264 p.
Tropical wildland fires and global changes: Prehistoric evidence, present fire regimes, and future trends. In: Global biomass burning (J.S. Levine, ed.), 83-91 (Chapter 10). The MIT Press, Massachusetts Institute of Technology, Cambridge.

External links
Complete list of Goldammer's publications

Wildfire suppression
1949 births
Living people
Max Planck Society people
University of Freiburg alumni
Biogeochemists